The Counter Assault Team (CAT) is a specialized tactical unit of the U.S. Secret Service that provides tactical support to the Presidential Protective Division to protect the President of the United States. This is in contrast to the Presidential Protective Division whose mission is to shield the president from an attack and to evacuate the president to a place of safety. The CAT can also provide tactical support to other designated protectees, at venues and National Special Security Events.

The Secret Service first began fielding counter assault teams in 1979. "Hawkeye" is the designation for a CAT assigned to the president, followed by the president's Secret Service code name. For example, the code name for President Obama's CAT was "Hawkeye Renegade".

History
Prior to 1979, Secret Service vehicle convoys for VIPs in high-risk situations included a large sedan known as the "muscle car" in which five or six Secret Service special agents armed with sub-machine guns rode. The "muscle car" team was an ad hoc contingent drawn from special agents working at a local Secret Service office, as opposed to those regularly assigned to protective duties. They were instructed, in the event of an attack against the convoy, to lay-down a barrage of suppressive fire against the source of the attack so as to allow the dignitary's vehicle the opportunity to escape without being pursued or blockaded.

In 1979 the Secret Service formalized the counter-assault team program with permanently assigned, specially trained operators.

Hawkeye

Following the attempted assassination of Ronald Reagan, a CAT that came to be designated "Hawkeye" was assigned to full-time presidential escort duty. According to Dan Bongino, Hawkeye has never responded to an actual armed attack.

Special agents assigned to Hawkeye were implicated in the Summit of the Americas prostitution scandal in 2012.

Operations

Selection and training
Members of the counter assault team are Secret Service special agents who have completed an initial, eight-month course at the Federal Law Enforcement Training Center in Glynco, Georgia, and have successfully served at least several years in the Secret Service. Upon selection, CAT operators undergo an additional seven weeks of specialized training that includes counter-ambush tactics and close quarters combat. Applications for the team are competitive and physical requirements for entry include three pull-ups wearing a  weighted vest and a  run in under nine minutes. Approximately ten percent of applicants are ultimately selected.

Equipment
Typically, CAT members deploy in black battle dress uniforms. Each member not otherwise assigned a heavier weapon, is equipped with a SR-16 rifle, a Glock 17 pistol, and some flash-bang grenades.

Duties
CAT operates both as part of motorcades and at fixed sites. In the event a VIP, the VIP's vehicle, or a protected site is attacked by multiple assailants, CAT is responsible for engaging and diverting the attackers, thereby buying the close protection shift time to evacuate the dignitary to a safe area.

Hawkeye, when operating as part of a U.S. president's motorcade, travels in a vehicle several car lengths behind the presidential state car.

See also
 FBI Hostage Rescue Team
 DSS Mobile Security Deployments

References

Police tactical units
Government agencies established in 1979
Counter-Assault Team